Pavol Penksa (born 7 November 1985) is a retired Slovak footballer who played as a goalkeeper.

Penksa signed a short-term deal with Scottish club Raith Rovers in March 2017, after all three of the club's goalkeepers were unfit to participate in matches.

References

External links
 MFK Ružomberok profile 

1985 births
Living people
Sportspeople from Spišská Nová Ves
Slovak footballers
Slovak expatriate footballers
Association football goalkeepers
FK Spišská Nová Ves players
SV Horn players
MFK Stará Ľubovňa players
Fotbal Kunovice players
FK Tatran Prachatice players
FK Slovan Duslo Šaľa players
MFK Ružomberok players
Anagennisi Deryneia FC players
Zalaegerszegi TE players
FC DAC 1904 Dunajská Streda players
FK Železiarne Podbrezová players
FK Frýdek-Místek players
FK Iskra Borčice players
1. FC Tatran Prešov players
ŠKF Sereď players
Raith Rovers F.C. players
Slovak Super Liga players
2. Liga (Slovakia) players
Cypriot First Division players
Czech National Football League players
Nemzeti Bajnokság II players
Scottish Professional Football League players
Expatriate footballers in Austria
Expatriate footballers in Cyprus
Expatriate footballers in Hungary
Expatriate footballers in the Czech Republic
Expatriate footballers in Scotland
Slovak expatriate sportspeople in Austria
Slovak expatriate sportspeople in Cyprus
Slovak expatriate sportspeople in Hungary
Slovak expatriate sportspeople in the Czech Republic
Slovak expatriate sportspeople in Scotland